Robert Porter "Buddy" Tinsley (August 16, 1924 – September 14, 2011) was a Canadian Football League offensive lineman for the Winnipeg Blue Bombers. He was inducted into the Canadian Football Hall of Fame in 1982, and was a member of the Winnipeg Blue Bombers Hall of Fame, the Manitoba Sports Hall of Fame and the Baylor University Hall of Fame.

Tinsley was born in Damon, Texas and played collegiately at Baylor. He spent one season with the NFL's Los Angeles Rams before joining the Blue Bombers, where he often played both ways at tackle.

He is noted for a story regarding the 38th Grey Cup, known as the "Mud Bowl" because of poor weather/field conditions. "As the legend goes, Tinsley, a rookie Bomber lineman, was face down in the muck and water, gasping for breath when an alert official pulled him from his murky grave".

Tinsley died on September 14, 2011, aged 87, from undisclosed causes, in Winnipeg, Manitoba.

Footnotes

1924 births
2011 deaths
American players of Canadian football
American football offensive linemen
Baylor Bears football players
Canadian football offensive linemen
Canadian Football Hall of Fame inductees
Manitoba Sports Hall of Fame inductees
Los Angeles Dons players
People from Brazoria County, Texas
Winnipeg Blue Bombers players